Ananth Raman is an economist, focusing in supply chain management and the investors’ perspective on operations, currently the UPS Foundation Professor of Business Logistics at Harvard Business School.

References

Harvard Business School faculty
21st-century American economists
Living people
Year of birth missing (living people)